The Swiss Men's Curling Championship is the national championship of men's curling in Switzerland. It has been held annually since 1943.

List of champions

References

Swiss Curling Association Champions
 (before 2003 team line-ups shown in reverse order: lead, second, third, skip)
Curling Schweizermeisterschaft - www.ccflims.ch - 3. bis 20. Februar 2016, Flims (at last page list of all Swiss curling champion teams: men's 1943—2015 and women's 1964—2015; before 2003 team line-ups shown in reverse order: alternate (if exists), lead, second, third, skip)
Erfolge des Curling Club Dübendorf

See also
Swiss Women's Curling Championship
Swiss Mixed Doubles Curling Championship
Swiss Mixed Curling Championship
Swiss Junior Curling Championships
Swiss Wheelchair Curling Championship
Swiss Senior Curling Championships

Curling competitions in Switzerland
Men's sports competitions in Switzerland
National curling championships